Songzio is a South Korean privately held fashion house founded in 1993 in Seoul. Songzio is the largest eponymous designer label in South Korea operating four brands: Songzio, Songzio Homme, Zzero by Songzio and Zio Songzio. The brand specializes in high-end menswear, contemporary ready to wear, and accessories for men and women.

History

Founded in 1993 in Seoul, South Korea, Songzio gained fame with its emblematic look: the black look. Working closely with the Korean entertainment industry, the brand frequently features actors Cha Seung-won, Lee Soo-hyuk and any k-pop star in its Seoul fashion shows. The brand is recognized for playing an important role in popularizing men's fashion and high end designer clothing in Korea. Songzio began its international expansion in Paris Fashion Week in 2006 with a new collection line. With its campaign, Paint on Black, the brand is known for fusing house art with contemporary designs.

Songzio is also known for its variety of collaboration collection with brands around the world. 

The brand operates four brands: Songzio, Songzio Homme, Zzero by Songzio and Zio Songzio. Songzio is the house's flagship brand exhibiting the brand's signature oriental avant-garde aesthetic. Songzio Homme is the high end contemporary menswear brand with ready to wear interpretations of Songzio's collections. Zzero is the brand's unisex youth street brand with an artist following in Korea. ZioSongzio is the brand's most accessible and commercial diffusion label. 

From 2017, Jay Songzio is successfully driving the brand as both Creative and Business director. After the appointed to such positions, Songzio expanded from just one store in Seoul to 4 brands with 80 stores all around South Korea.

Achievements

Since 2012, Songzio serves as the Governor of Asian Couture Federation.

Since 2016, Songzio serves as the Chairman of Council of Fashion Designers of Korea.

In 2017, Songzio received a Commendation of Recognition from the Korean Ministry of Culture and was appointed as a member of Ministry of Culture's international cultural expansion committee.

In 2018, the brand launched Songzio Homme, a high end contemporary brand. With the launch of Songzio Homme, Songzio has become the largest eponymous designer brand in South Korea with three brands each in high end, middle market, and commercial markets. With this achievement, Songzio was named as 51 leaders of Korea by Forbes Korea for two consecutive years in 2018 and 2019.

In 2018, Songzio was appointed as the Honorary Ambassador to the City of Seoul, South Korea to promote Seoul's culture and represent its fashion industry.

Collaborations

2020 Spring/Summer - Disney

2020 Fall/Winter - Disney, Tim Burton

2021 Spring/Summer - Song Min-ho(Mino), Winnie-the-Pooh

2021 Fall/Winter - Bae Jung-nam

2022 Spring/Summer - Toy Story

2022 Fall/Winter - Peanuts(Snoopy)

Today

As the largest designer's eponymous fashion house in South Korea, Songzio operates 80 stores all around the South Korea.

References

Luxury brands
High fashion brands
Companies based in Seoul